Ander Lafuente Aguado (born 18 February 1983) is a Spanish former professional footballer who played as a midfielder.

Club career
Lafuente was born in Santurtzi, Biscay. After unsuccessfully emerging through the youth ranks of Athletic Bilbao – he only played for affiliates CD Basconia and Bilbao Athletic – he signed with third division side FC Cartagena in 2005.

Loaned to fellow league team Granada CF for 2008–09 and experiencing a solid season albeit with no promotion, Lafuente returned to Cartagena the following summer, with the club now in the second tier. He made his professional debut with the latter on 29 August 2009, playing 59 minutes in a 1–0 away win against Girona FC, and scored his first goal in the competition on 19 September to help to a 2–1 home defeat of CD Castellón. Additionally, in the return match against the former opposition, he netted twice in a 4–1 victory also at the Estadio Cartagonova.

In the summer of 2013, after one season in division two with SD Ponferradina, Lafuente returned to the lower leagues with Racing de Santander. After two years with Sestao River Club, the 33-year-old moved to amateur football.

References

External links

1983 births
Living people
People from Santurtzi
Sportspeople from Biscay
Spanish footballers
Footballers from the Basque Country (autonomous community)
Association football midfielders
Segunda División players
Segunda División B players
Tercera División players
Divisiones Regionales de Fútbol players
CD Basconia footballers
Bilbao Athletic footballers
Athletic Bilbao footballers
FC Cartagena footballers
Granada CF footballers
SD Ponferradina players
Racing de Santander players
Sestao River footballers